Bellerive is a suburb of the City of Clarence, part of the greater Hobart area, Tasmania, Australia. It stretches from Kangaroo Bay where it borders Rosny Park, around the curved shoreline of Bellerive Esplanade to Kangaroo Bluff, then down to Bellerive Beach and east to Second Bluff, where Bellerive borders Howrah. To the north Bellerive is bordered by the small foothills of Waverly Flora Park.

History

Bellerive was first settled in the 1820s, and at that time known as "Kangaroo Point", for the large numbers Kangaroos that would be seen on the shore. Even before this time a ferryman regularly crossed the Derwent, coming ashore in the Bellerive area. Following the first settlers, the area expanded rapidly, with roads to the farming districts of Clarence Plains (Rokeby), Coal River (Richmond) and Hollow Tree (Cambridge) soon developing.

By the 1830s the name was changed to Bellerive (French for "beautiful shore") and the village had become the hub of eastern shore contact with Hobart, and several boats would cross between Bellerive and Sullivans Cove every day.

Early on, farming and slaughterhouses where the main businesses in the area. In 1834 there were four known hotel/inn/taverns: Clarence House (1835–1838), Golden Fleece Inn (1823–1838), Highlander (1835–1861) and the Plough (1835–1866). The Wheat Sheef (1838–1842) opened and closed during this time.
The Clarence Hotel, built in 1879, has long been both a local social centre and waiting point for ferry passengers.
The Bellerive Hotel existed according to licensing records between 1862–1865 and 1898–1901.

One of the oldest surviving buildings in Bellerive is the Commandant's Cottage. The original Police Station was built in 1842 from local sandstone, much of the original structure still remains intact and contains an original cell. Later cells, made from weatherboards still survive as well. The building has had various usages in it life including municipal council chambers, district library and the CIB headquarters, although it is currently used as a community arts centre. The Bellerive Primary School was also built in 1842.

The St Mark's Chapel, Bellerive an Anglican church was built in 1851 on the former site of the 1826 "Chapel of Ease".

The area around Bellerive Quay and the boardwalk has a quaint village feel, with many historical homes and buildings in the area, some of which date from the early 19th century.  The old Bellerive Post Office, which was built in 1897, now houses both the Sound Preservation Museum and the Genealogical Society of Tasmania. At the point of Kangaroo Bluff is the 19th century British fortress known as Kangaroo Battery (built 1885) which is now a public park.

From 2 May 1892 until 30 June 1926 the Bellerive-Sorell Railway had its terminus on a long jetty which extended into the Bay on reclaimed land which now makes up part of the boardwalk.

The former 300 seat Regent Theatre opened on the corner of Percy Street and Cambridge Road on 5 November 1931. The building doubled as the Bellerive town hall, hosting community activities and events. The theatre closed in the 1960s. It reopened as the Civic Cinema in 1975 with  Petersen, which included actor Wendy Hughes in attendance for the premiere. The Civic was closed in 1977 and subsequently demolished in the 1980s for the Bellerive Quay building.

Bellerive is also the eastern port of call for Hobart commuter ferries.

Population 
In the 2016 Census, there were 4,507 people in Bellerive. 82.2% of people were born in Australia. The next most common country of birth was England at 4.0%. 89.0% of people only spoke English at home. The most common responses for religion were No Religion 36.3%, Anglican 21.7% and Catholic 19.4%.

Sport 
Bellerive is best known as the home of international cricket ground Bellerive Oval. Is it also a popular sailing area, home to Bellerive Yacht Club (1926) and has a marina located at Bellerive Quay.

Notable residents 
 McAulay, Alexander Leicester (1895–1969)
 Murray, Pembroke Lathrop (1846–1929)
 Nettlefold, Leonard (1905–1971)
 O'May, George Elwin (1876–1956)
 O'May, Henry (Harry) (1872–1962)
 Sharland, Michael Stanley Reid (1899–1987)

References

External links
Bellerive Primary School

Localities of City of Clarence